Lady Powers Live at the Forum is the first live album by Australian folk musician Vera Blue. The album was recorded on 2 June 2018 at the Forum Theatre, Melbourne during her Lady Powers Tour and includes tracks from her extended play Fingertips and studio album Perennial. The album was released digitally on 26 October 2018.

Promotion
16 live videos, filmed from the show, will be released weekly with the first being "Magazine" on 26 October 2018.

Track listing

Release history

References

Vera Blue albums
2018 live albums
Live albums by Australian artists